Serpente was the name of at least two ships of the Italian Navy and may refer to:

 , a  launched in 1905 and sunk in 1916.
 , an  ordered as Nautilus Launched in 1932 and scuttled in 1943.

Italian Navy ship names